Tuta may refer to:

Geography
Tuta, Boyacá, a municipality in Boyacá Department, Colombia
Tuta, a village in Târgu Trotuș Commune, Bacău County, Romania

People
Frederick Tuta (1269–1291), Margrave of Landsberg
Mladen Naletilić Tuta (1946–2021), Bosnian Croat paramilitary leader
Servando Gómez Martínez (born 1966), Mexican drug lord nicknamed La Tuta
Tuta (footballer, born 1974), the nickname of Brazilian footballer, Moacir Bastos
Tuta (footballer, born 1984), the nickname of Brazilian footballer, Adorcelino Wesley Gomes da Silva
Tuta (footballer, born 1999), the nickname of Brazilian footballer, Lucas Silva Melo

Other
Tuta (moth), a moth (Lepidoptera, Gelechiidae) genus
TUTA, the Australian Trade Union Training Authority
TUTA Theatre, Chicago-based theatre company
TuTa, a form of boilersuit designed by Thayaht

See also
Tutta, a feminine given name